Amílcar Augusto Villafuerte Trujillo (born 31 January 1964) is a Mexican politician affiliated with the PVEM. As of 2013 he served as Deputy of the LXII Legislature of the Mexican Congress representing Chiapas.

References

1964 births
Living people
Politicians from Chiapas
Ecologist Green Party of Mexico politicians
21st-century Mexican politicians
People from Venustiano Carranza, Chiapas
Deputies of the LXII Legislature of Mexico
Members of the Chamber of Deputies (Mexico) for Chiapas